

Australia
 Papua and New Guinea
 High Commissioner – David Hay, High Commissioner in Papua and New Guinea (1966–1970)

France
 Afars and Issas
 Commissioner – Louis Saget, High Commissioner of the Afars and Issas (1967–1969)
 Governing Council – Ali Aref Bourhan, President of the Governing Council (1967–1976)

Portugal
 Angola – Camilo Augusto de Miranda Rebocho Vaz, High Commissioner of Angola (1966–1972)

Atlantis

Colonial governors
Colonial governors
1968